The 2002 FIFA World Player of the Year award was won by Ronaldo for a record-breaking third time. It was the award's 12th edition. Mia Hamm won the women's award. The gala was hosted at the Congress Centre in Madrid, on December 17, 2002. 147 national team coaches, based on the current FIFA Men's World Ranking were chosen to vote for the men's edition and 77 for the women's. The ceremony theme was Real Madrid's Centenary Charity match against the World XI (3-3) that was played at the Santiago Bernabeu Stadium in front of 55,000 spectators.

Results

Men

Women

References

FIFA World Player of the Year
FIFA World Player of the Year
2002 in women's association football
Women's association football trophies and awards